Graham Vines (born 9 October 1930) is a British cyclist. He competed in the individual and team road race events at the 1952 Summer Olympics.

References

External links
 

1930 births
Living people
British male cyclists
Olympic cyclists of Great Britain
Cyclists at the 1952 Summer Olympics
Cyclists from Greater London